The 2019 Women's Super 3s, known for sponsorship reasons as the 2019 Toyota Super 3s, was the fifth Women's Super 3s competition that took place in Ireland. It ran from May to July, with 3 teams taking part made up of the best players in Ireland. The teams played 10 matches each, two 50 over matches and eight Twenty20s. Dragons won the competition, winning their third title, and second in two seasons.

Competition format
The three teams played ten matches each in a league system. Each team played the other two sides once in a 50 over match and four times in a Twenty20 match, with all matches contributing to a unified table.

The league worked on a points system with positions being based on the total points. Points were awarded as follows:

Win: 2 points. 
Tie: 1 point. 
Loss: 0 points.
Abandoned/No Result: 1 point.

Squads

Source: Cricket Ireland

Points table

Source: CricketArchive

References

Women's Super Series
Women's Super 3s
Super 3s